The Woodlands Regional Library (WRL; Chinese: 兀兰区域图书馆) is a regional public library in Woodlands in the North Region of Singapore. It is located within the premises of the Woodlands Civic Centre, near Causeway Point, Woodlands Bus Interchange and Woodlands MRT station. The library has a floor space of 11,100 square metres and currently has 540,000 items in its collection.

History
Woodlands Regional Library was officially opened on 28 April 2001 by Dr Tony Tan Kheng Yam, then-Deputy Prime Minister of Singapore, Minister for Defence and MP, Sembawang GRC (who later became Singapore's 7th President). It was Singapore’s first full-fledged regional library following the prototype regional library in Tampines. Occupying four storeys and part of a basement over a floor space of 11,100 square meters in the Woodlands Civic Centre, it is a one-stop information centre for the northern sector of Singapore.

Layout

Woodlands Regional Library occupies four floors within Woodlands Civic Centre including a basement level.

Basement
The basement consists of an auditorium with 250 seats.

First floor
Also known as the Lifestyle section, the first level of the library is where the multimedia section is situated in. It has many collections of CDs, DVDs and magazines and newspapers. This level also consists of Artease Cafe as well as a few automated counters for borrowing books.

Second floor
The second floor is where the Reference section and self-contained multimedia booths for surfing the Internet are located. It has a wide collection of reference books, CDs and magazines which cannot be loaned from this level. There are also research carrels for people who want to conduct research, and a photocopy machine in one corner of the level. The Young People's section are also located on this level.

Third floor
The third level is the section for adult fiction and non-fiction in Singaporeʻs four national languages; English, Chinese, Malay and Tamil, and also has counters for borrowing books, like those in the first floor. It also has a Quiet Reading Room for people who want to read quietly.

Fourth floor
The fourth level is where the children section is. It also has a small garden-like feature, called the Enchanted Tree as well as the Children's Reading Park.

References

External links
 National Library Board Woodlands Regional Library

2001 establishments in Singapore
Libraries established in 2001
Libraries in Singapore
Government buildings completed in 2001
Woodlands, Singapore